Technique Stadium (formerly known as b2net Stadium and Proact Stadium) is an all-seater football stadium in Whittington Moor, Chesterfield, Derbyshire, on the site of the former Dema Glassworks. It is the home of Chesterfield FC, replacing the Saltergate Recreation Ground as the club's stadium from the start of the 2010–11 season.

When it hosts England youth matches it is known as Chesterfield FC Stadium.

It has a capacity of approximately 10,500, cost £13,000,000 to build and was designed by Sheffield-based architects Ward McHugh Associates.

The stadium staged England under-19 and under-21 fixtures in 2011 and May 2012 with nearly 10,000 fans, and hosted Elton John in 2012.

History

The Dema Glass site emerged as a possible location in October 2004 at a time when the club were already pursuing planning permission to redevelop Wheeldon Mill, the town's former greyhound stadium. Chesterfield Borough Council viewed the site as part of a masterplan to regenerate the A61 corridor, an area to the north of the town centre and including the Chesterfield Canal. Agreement in principle between the club and local authority was struck in February 2005, though progress faced initial delays.

Designs for the proposed new stadium were provided by local architects Ward McHugh Associates who had previously undertaken commissions on the redevelopment of the South Stand at Twickenham and Everton's Goodison Park stadium.

Planning permission was granted after a public meeting held on 1 July 2008, with the plans forming part of a wider mixed-use development. The land at the site was handed over to the club in February 2009 and, after decontamination, construction officially started on Thursday 23 July 2009, overseen by GB Development Solutions. Separate buildings which formed part of the overall scheme included a Tesco Extra superstore, Tesco petrol station, a KFC, an Enterprise car rental and other office facilities.

The new stadium was handed over to the club in July 2010 and granted its full capacity licence from the Safety Advisory Group after hosting two limited capacity games against Derby County and Barnsley.

A music video for the single "Run Away Instead" by indie rock band The Rosadocs was filmed on the pitch in August 2021, the first music video to have been shot at the stadium.

Name changes

Initial sponsorship under the name the b2net Stadium was revealed on 14 August 2009. However, after two seasons and following the acquisition of b2net by Swedish company Proact, the renaming of the stadium to the 'Proact Stadium' was officially announced on 13 August 2012. Due to UEFA restrictions, when it hosts England youth matches it is known as Chesterfield FC Stadium.

The stadium was renamed to the Technique Stadium in August 2020.

Stands and facilities

The ground's four stands are: The VanYard (West) Stand, Motan Colortronic (South) Stand, Rubicon Print (North) Stand and Karen Child Community (East) Stand. Unlike Saltergate, Chesterfield's old home, all stands enjoy unrestricted views.

The VanYard (West) Stand

The VanYard (West) Stand has a curved roof line and a capacity of 3,144 seats with glazed windshields on either side and executive facilities at the rear. The stand includes conference rooms and banqueting rooms, including the Leengate Legends Lounge, and is where the majority of the club's non-footballing revenue is generated. The stand is sponsored by VanYard.

Motan Colortronic (South) Stand

Located behind the goal on the south side of the stadium, this stand is regarded as similar to the former Saltergate Kop in being the area where the main atmosphere is created by home supporters. Its capacity is 2,064 seats.

Rubicon Print (North) Stand

The north stand is almost identical to the south stand; the only difference is the north stand has only one disabled gantry while the south stand has two. Away supporters are primarily housed in this stand, where up to 2,088 can be seated. At the time the ground opened, the north stand was called the ’Printability Stand’.

Karen Child Community (East) Stand

Like the main stand, the east stand has a curved roof line but with no executive facilities at the rear. It includes a multi-purpose sports and community room, sports injury clinic, meeting rooms, a gym and healthy living resource for all ages, a wave pool for rehabilitation, heritage room, classroom resource centre for local education, a soft play area for youngsters, and a cafeteria. Additional space for away fans may be provided in this stand as demand requires. Its capacity is 3,208 seats. The stand is sponsored by supporter Karen Child-Smith who won the National Lottery in 2007. (At the time the ground opened, the East Stand was called the 'Midlands Co-operative Community Stand').

All four stands encompass concourse facilities under the stand, including on-tap beverages and multiple television screens showing the game in progress, and Sky Sports channels before and after the game.

The HUB

On the exterior of the East Stand is a £1.7m community facility called 'the HUB'. This two-story building was opened in September 2013 by the Chesterfield FC Community Trust. The HUB includes a cafe, 'Chester's Den', a playcentre, a gym, a therapy pool, a multi-use sports hall and classrooms. The facility also houses the offices of the Trust as well as other tenants and a martial arts dojo.

Chesterfield FC Memorial Garden

A memorial garden was opened in September 2014. Built by the Supporters' Club and now maintained by the Chesterfield FC Community Trust, the Garden is adjacent to the HUB. The Garden is intended as a memorial to fans and players of Chesterfield FC It also includes a war memorial recognising the seventeen football club players and officials who died in the wars of the 20th century.

Notable fixtures

The official opening match was a friendly against Derby County on 24 July 2010, during which summer signing Craig Davies scored the first ever goal, in a game that finished in a 5–4 win for Derby.

The first competitive league fixture (Football League Two) was against Barnet on 7 August 2010. The game finished with a 2–1 victory to Chesterfield. Dwayne Mattis and Jack Lester were the goalscorers.

The highest attendance for all games was 10,089 for the League Two clash against local rivals Rotherham United on 18 March 2011. The game finished with a resounding 5–0 victory for Chesterfield.

On 8 February 2011 the stadium hosted its first international game when England under-19s played Germany under-19s in a friendly. The game finished with a 1–0 victory for the visiting German side. On 10 September 2012, it hosted England under-21s final 2013 UEFA European Under-21 Championship qualification Group 8 match against Norway's under-21s. The hosts edged out the visitors 1 – 0 thanks to Connor Wickham's forty third-minute goal with 9,947 in attendance.

See also
Ground improvements to football stadia in England

References

External links
Official stadium website
Proact entry at AwayGrounds.com
Chesterfield FC – New stadium fly thru (Video)
Ward McHugh Associates – Stadium Architects

Chesterfield F.C.
Football venues in England
Football venues in Derbyshire
Sports venues completed in 2010
English Football League venues
Buildings and structures in Chesterfield, Derbyshire